The 2011–12 NBL season was the 23rd season for the Sydney Kings in the NBL.

Off-season
After talk of gaining international superstar, Andrew Bogut, due to the 2011 NBA Lockout, the deal eventually fell through as the club could not pay out his high insurance.

Additions

Current squad

Depth chart

Regular season

Standings

Game log

|- style="background-color:#ffcccc;"
| 1
| 7 October
| @ Melbourne
| L 76-82
| Julian Khazzouh (18)
| Julian Khazzouh (14)
| Aaron Bruce (3)
| State Netball and Hockey Centre  
| 0-1
|- style="background-color:#ffcccc;"
| 2
| 15 October
| New Zealand
| L 61-98
| Aaron Bruce (13)
| Jerai Grant (7)
| Aaron Bruce &  Luke Cooper (5)
| The Kingdome 
| 0-2
|- style="background-color:#bbffbb;"
| 3
| 21 October
| @ Adelaide
| W 94-71
| Julian Khazzouh (26)
| Julian Khazzouh (13)
| Aaron Bruce (6)
| Adelaide Arena  
| 1-2
|- style="background-color:#bbffbb;"
| 4
| 23 October
| Wollongong
| W 95-89
| Anatoly Bose (24)
| Jerai Grant (14)
| Aaron Bruce (7)
| The Kingdome 
| 2-2
|- style="background-color:#ffcccc;"
| 5
| 28 October
| @ New Zealand
| L 59-76
| Julian Khazzouh (16)
| Jerai Grant (12)
| Aaron Bruce (7)
| North Shore Events Centre 
| 2-3

Player statistics

Regular season

Finals

Awards

Player of the Week

Player of the Month

Coach of the Month

See also
2011–12 NBL season

References

External links
Official Website

Sydney
Sydney Kings seasons